Mauricio Guilherme Silva Jr. is a Brazilian author and cultural critic. His work investigates the relationship between journalism and literature, mainly on issues related to educommunication and the interaction between communicative processes and artistic expressions.

Career 
Silva Jr. graduated in Social Communication in 1999, with qualification in Journalism, from the Federal University of Minas Gerais. Afterwards, he became a master and doctor in Literary Studies, between 2014 and 2012, by the same institution. He wrote works on the poetry of José Paulo Paes and the relationship between history, literature and journalism in chronicles by Carlos Heitor Cony. Silva Jr. he is also a postdoctoral fellow at the Graduate Program in Social Communication at the Federal University of Minas Gerais, and teaches courses in Journalism and Fashion at the University Center of Belo Horizonte (UniBH). It is also part of the Scientific and Technological Communication Program (PCCT) of the Research Support Foundation of the State of Minas Gerais (Fapemig). He is also editor-in-chief of the magazine Minas faz Ciência and leads the research groups Educomuni, at UniBH; SBPJor Narrativas, formed by several institutions; Media Narratives (Nami), from the University of Sorocaba; NERCOPC, from Federal University of MInas Gerais; and the Contemporary Media Narrative Research Network (Renami).

He is the author of several publications. As a music critic, he collaborated with the newspaper O Tempo and the Viamundo program, broadcast by Inconfidência FM radio. In 2014, Silva Jr. released the book Cronismo de Resistência, in which he tensioned narratives between journalism, history and literature in chronicles by Carlos Heitor Cony against the 1964 military coup in Brazil.

References 

21st-century Brazilian writers
Brazilian journalists
Brazilian writers
Federal University of Minas Gerais alumni